Eupithecia szelenyica is a moth in the family Geometridae. It is found in China.

References

Moths described in 1974
szelenyica
Moths of Asia